Dibektaş is a village in the Artuklu District of Mardin Province in Turkey. The village is populated by Kurds of the Dakoran tribe and had a population of 52 in 2021.

References 

Villages in Artuklu District
Kurdish settlements in Mardin Province